Anne Jean Marie René Savary, 1st Duke of Rovigo (26 April 17742 June 1833) was a French military officer and diplomat who served in the French Revolutionary Wars, the Napoleonic Wars and the French invasion of Algeria. He was Minister of Police between 1810 and 1814.

Early life and career
Savary was born at Marcq in the Ardennes. He was educated at the college of St Louis at Metz and entered the royal army in 1790. His first campaign was that waged by General Custine against the retreating forces of the duke of Brunswick in 1792. He next served in succession under Pichegru and Moreau, and distinguished himself during the skilful retreat of the latter from an untenable position in the heart of Swabia. He became chef d'escadron in 1797, and in 1798 served under General Louis Desaix, in the Egyptian campaign, of which he left an interesting and valuable account.

He also distinguished himself under Desaix at Marengo (14 June 1800). His fidelity and address while serving under Desaix, who was killed at Marengo, secured him the confidence of the First Consul Napoleon Bonaparte, who appointed him commander of the Elite Gendarmes of the Consular Guard. In the discovery of the various ramifications of the Georges Cadoudal-Pichegru conspiracy Savary showed great skill and activity. He proceeded to the cliff of Biville in Normandy, where the plotters were in the habit of landing, and sought, by imitating the signals of the royalist plotters, to tempt the comte d'Artois (afterwards Charles X) to land. In this he was unsuccessful.

He was in command of the troops at Vincennes when the duc d'Enghien was summarily executed. Hulin, who presided at the court-martial, afterwards accused Savary, though not by name, of having intervened to prevent the dispatch to Bonaparte of an appeal for mercy which Hulin was allegedly in the act of drawing up. Savary afterwards denied this, but his denial has not generally been accepted by historians.

Napoleonic Wars

In February 1805 he was raised to the rank of general of division. Shortly before the Battle of Austerlitz (2 December 1805), he was sent by Napoleon with a message to the emperor Alexander I with a request for an armistice, a device which caused that monarch all the more eagerly to strike the blow which brought disaster to the Russians. After the battle Savary again took a message to Alexander, which induced him to treat for an armistice. In the campaign of 1806, Savary showed signal daring in the pursuit of the Prussians after the Battle of Jena. He was negotiating during the Siege of Hameln. Early in the next year he received command of a corps, and with it gained an important success at Ostrolenka (16 February 1807).

After the treaty of Tilsit (7 July 1807) Savary proceeded to St Petersburg as the French ambassador, but was soon replaced by General Caulaincourt, another accessory to the execution of the duc d'Enghien. The repugnance of the empress dowager to Savary is said to have been one of the reasons of his recall, but it is more probable that Napoleon felt the need of his gifts for intrigue in the Spanish affairs which he undertook at the close of 1807. With the title of duke of Rovigo (a small town in Venetia), Savary set out for Madrid when Napoleon's plans for gaining the mastery of Spain were nearing completion. With Murat Savary made skilful use of the schisms in the Spanish royal family (March–April 1808), and persuaded Charles IV of Spain, who had recently abdicated under duress, and his son Ferdinand VII, the de facto king of Spain, to refer their claims to Napoleon. Savary induced Ferdinand to cross the Pyrenees and proceed to Bayonne—a step which cost him his crown and his liberty until 1814.

In September 1808, Savary accompanied the emperor to the famous meeting at the Congress of Erfurt with Alexander I. In 1809 he took part, albeit without distinction, in the campaign against Austria.

On the disgrace of Fouché in the spring of 1810, Savary received his Ministry of Police. There he showed his wonted skill and devotion to Napoleon; and this office, which the Jacobin Fouche had shorn of its terrors, now became a veritable inquisition. Among the incidents of his time may be cited the cynical brutality with which Savary carried out the order of Napoleon for the exile of Mme de Staël and the destruction of her work De l'Allemagne. Savary's wariness was, however, at fault at the time of the strange conspiracy of General Malet, two of whose confederates seized him in his bed and imprisoned him for a few hours (23 October 1812). Savary's reputation never quite recovered from the ridicule caused by this event. Napoleon awarded him the duché grand-fief (a rare, nominal but hereditary honor; extinguished in 1872) of Rovigo, in his own Kingdom of Italy.

Hundred Days and later life

He was among the last to desert the emperor at the time of his abdication (11 April 1814) and among the first to welcome his return (the Hundred Days) from Elba in 1815, when he became inspector-general of gendarmerie and a Peer of France. After the Battle of Waterloo he accompanied the emperor to Rochefort and sailed with him to Plymouth on HMS Bellerophon. He was not allowed to accompany him to Saint Helena, but underwent several months' "internment" at Malta. Escaping thence, he proceeded to Smyrna, where he settled for a time. Afterwards he travelled about in more or less distress, but finally was allowed to return to France and regained civic rights; later he settled at Rome.

The July Revolution (1830) brought him back into favour and in 1831 he received the command of the French army in Algeria. While in command at Algiers, he alienated French civil authorities with his high-handed treatment of Arab leaders. He was responsible for the extermination of the local El Ouffia tribe with Maximilien Joseph Schauenburg and the death of several Arab leaders whom he lured into negotiations. Ill-health compelled him to return to France, and he died in Paris in June 1833.

See also
 Massacre of El Ouffia
 Maximilien Joseph Schauenburg

Notes

References
  This work in turn cites:
 Mémoires du duc de Rovigo (4 vols., London, 1828; English edition also in 4 vols., London, 1828); a French edition annotated by D. Lacroix (5 vols., Paris, 1900)
 Extrait des mémoires de M. le duc de Rovigo concernant le catastrophe de M. le duc d'Enghien (London, 1823)
 Le Duc de Rovigo jugée par lui-même et par ses contemporains, by L. F. E. (Paris, 1823)
 A.F.N. Macquart, Refutation de l'écrit de M. le duc de Rovigo (1823).

External links

 
 

1774 births
1833 deaths
19th-century French diplomats
Ambassadors of France to the Russian Empire
Dukes of the First French Empire
French generals
French military personnel of the French Revolutionary Wars
French military personnel of the Napoleonic Wars
French police chiefs
Peers of France
Burials at Père Lachaise Cemetery
Members of the Chamber of Peers of the Hundred Days
Names inscribed under the Arc de Triomphe